The Red Sea Jazz Festival is a jazz festival held annually in Eilat, Israel.

The Red Sea Jazz Festival was first held in 1987. It is a four-day-long event featuring 9-10 concerts per evening, 6 workshops with guest artists and nightly jam sessions. All performances are held outdoors at the Eilat port. The workshops take place at a nearby hotel.

The festival offers a combination of performances by international jazz artists and local talent. It also provides a venue for collaborative efforts, with special productions exclusive to the festival. Some of these special productions have included Randy Brecker & Mark Egan, The Jazz Beatles, Miroslav Vitous & John Abercrombie, and Charlie Haden & John Scofield.

The festival draws audiences of 70,000, with an average of 2,500 people per concert. It is run as a non-profit organization and enjoys the support of the Municipality of Eilat, the Ministries of Culture and Tourism, the Eilat Hotel Association and various business sponsors.

In 2008, Israeli jazz bassist Avishai Cohen was named artistic director, replacing Dan Gottfried, who initiated the festival and served as artistic director for 22 years. During his tenure Gottfried has showcased over 1500 world-famous Jazz artists and established the reputation of the festival as one of the leading Jazz events worldwide. Under Cohen's direction in 2009, the festival showcased young talent and original compositions along with world-renowned jazz artists.

The festival is held in the last week of August.

A 3-day Winter Jazz Festival, held on the third weekend in January, was initiated in 2010.

Notable artists

2006 

Mory Kante
Gonzalo Rubalcaba
Suthukazi Arosi
Latin Groove Orquestra
The Mingus Dynasty
Rick Margitza
Franck Amsalem

2007 

Tomasz Stanko
Chris Potter
Incognito
Sara Lazarus
Steps Ahead
Conrad Herwig
Joey DeFrancesco

2008 
Randy Brecker
Bill Evans
Kurt Elling
Carla Bley
Mike Stern
Richard Bona
Ben Riley
Oregon
Terri Lyne Carrington
John Fedchock
Omar Sosa
Zbigniew Namyslowski
Avishai Cohen

2009 
Dee Dee Bridgewater
John Scofield
Eli Degibri 
Rob Ickes
Paquito D'Rivera
Lionel Loueke
Jean-Michel Pilc
Chano Domínguez
Kurt Rosenwinkel

Israeli jazz acts included:
The Apples
Funk'n'Stein
Amos Hoffman
Marina Maximilian Blumin

2010 

Rickie Lee Jones 	
Dave Weckl 	
Gary Burton 	
Nikki Yanofsky	
Jeff Watts 	
Hermeto Pascoal 	
Dave Douglas
Stefon Harris
 	
Israeli acts included:	
Berry Sakharof
Marsh Dondurama	
Ofer Ganor

2011 

Avishai Cohen
Michael Kaeshammer
Steve Smith
Grégoire Maret
Gretchen Parlato
Assaf Avidan

Israeli acts included Yael Deckelbaum, Yoni Rechter, and Zohar Fresko, among others.

2012 

Christian McBride
Carmen Souza
Richard Bona
Sean Jones
YES! trio (Aaron Goldberg, Omer Avital, and Ali Jackson)
Minvielle/Suarez/Dufour trio
Gilad Hekselman
Geri Allen
Kenny Garrett

Israeli acts included:
Karen Malka
Tomer Bar Trio
Dudu Tassa
Daniel Ori
Yuval Cohen, among others

2013 

Al Foster
Antonio Sánchez
Nicholas Payton
Gerald Clayton
Jeff Ballard
João Bosco
Motion Trio

Israeli acts included Ester Rada, Tatran and Tammy Scheffer among others.

2014 
Fred Hersch
Antoine Roney
Dayna Stephens
Lee Konitz
Leny Andrade
Dr. Lonnie Smith
Dave Douglas & Uri Caine

Israeli Acts included Marina Maximilian, Omer Avital and Ofri Nehemya among others.

See also
Culture of Israel
Music of Israel

References

External links 
Official site

Eilat
Jazz festivals in Israel
Tourist attractions in Southern District (Israel)
Music festivals established in 1987
Summer events in Israel
1987 establishments in Israel